Kudushlibashevo (Köźöşlöbaş) is a rural locality (a village) in Starokurmashevsky Selsoviet, Kushnarenkovsky District, Bashkortostan, Russia. The population was 56 as of 2010. There is 1 street.

Geography 
Kudushlibashevo is located 9 km southwest of Kushnarenkovo (the district's administrative centre) by road. Starokurmashevo is the nearest rural locality.

References 

Rural localities in Kushnarenkovsky District